Livingstone Puckerin (19 June 1969 – 18 September 2018) was a Barbadian cricketer. He played in eighteen first-class and fourteen List A matches for the Barbados cricket team from 1988 to 1996, and became the manager of the team in 2008. He died in September 2018 at the age of 49, after being diagnosed with cancer.

See also
 List of Barbadian representative cricketers

References

External links
 

1969 births
2018 deaths
Barbadian cricketers
Barbados cricketers
People from Saint John, Barbados
Deaths from cancer in Barbados